Earthquake Visions is the album that the glam-style metal band It's Alive recorded for Cheiron Studios in 1994. Earthquake Visions eventually sold a disappointing 30,000 copies, but furthermore established the contact between Cheiron and the band's vocalist Martin White – better known as the famous-to-be producer/songwriter Max Martin.

Track listing
 "Give Us A Place" 3:51
 "Someone In The House" 4:13
 "I'm Your Man" 4:25
 "Pretend I'm God" 3:23
 "Sing This Blues" 4:29
 "Wild" 4:08
 "Metalapolis" 3:39
 "Maybe You Are But I'm Not" 3:11
 "Pain" 3:52
 "There Is Something" 4:11
 "Where I" 3:38

Note that the 1993 Music for Nations UK release adds two bonus songs; one, called "Play That Funky Music" (4:43) is slotted between "I'm Your Man" and "Pretend I'm God". The other track, called "Parasite" (3:10), is tacked on to the end of the disc, bringing it to a total of 13 songs.

Personnel
 Max Martin - lead vocals
 Per Aldeheim - lead guitar
 Kim Björkegren - rhythm guitar
 Peter Kahm - bass guitar
 Gus - drums
 John Rosth - keyboard

1994 albums
It's Alive (band) albums